Music from Mission: Impossible is an album featuring music composed and conducted by Lalo Schifrin recorded in 1967 and released on the Dot label. The music on this album is rerecorded and extended scores that were originally commissioned for the TV series Mission: Impossible.

Reception
Schifrin was awarded two Grammys  at the 10th Grammy Awards for his work on the first series (Best Instrumental Theme and Best Original Score for a Motion Picture or TV Show).

The album peaked at 47 on the Billboard Albums Chart and 11 on the magazine's jazz chart in 1968.

The Allmusic review states: "Any fan of the show should try and find this album at a used music shop, but more specifically fans of Lalo Schifrin (and that could be quite a few, as he remained uncredited on some of his TV themes) should definitely check the album out. It's a good buy if you can find it".

Track listing
All compositions by Lalo Schifrin except as indicated
 "Mission: Impossible" - 2:31
 "Jim on the Move" - 3:12
 "Operation Charm" -  2:55
 "The Sniper" - 3:20
 "Rollin Hand" -  2:48
 "The Plot" - 2:25
 "Wide Willy" - 2:03
 "Cinnamon (The Lady Was Made to Be Loved)" (Jack Urbont, Bruce Geller) - 2:36
 "Barney Does It All" - 2:30
 "Danger" - 2:44
 "Mission: Accomplished" - 2:40
Recorded in Hollywood, California on October 4, 5 & 7, 1967

Personnel
Lalo Schifrin - piano, harpsichord, arranger, conductor
Al Porcino, John Audino, Tony Terran, Ray Triscari, Stuart Williamson - trumpet
Billy Byers - trombone, arranger
Dick Nash, George Roberts, Dick Leith, Lloyd Ulyate - trombone
Vincent DeRosa, Bill Hinshaw, David Duke, Richard Mackey - French horn
Bud Shank, Ronald Langinger, Justin Gordon, John Lowe, Jack Nimitz - reeds
Mike Melvoin - piano, harpsichord
Paul Beaver - piano
Bob Bain, Tommy Tedesco - guitar
Bill Plummer - sitar
Ray Brown - bass
Carol Kaye - electric bass
Earl Palmer - drums, percussion
Shelly Manne - drums
Adolfo Valdes - bongos, conga
Ken Watson, Emil Richards - percussion
Anatol Kaminsky, Paul Shure, Bonnie Douglas, Sam Freed, Marvin Limonick, Alexander Murray, Irma Neumann, George Kast, Nathan Kaproff, Thelma Beach, James Getzoff, George Berres, Ambrose Russo, Joe Stepansky, Irma Neumann- violin
Allan Harshman, Myra Kestenbaum, Milton Thomas, Myer Bello - viola
Raphael Kramer, Leanor Slatkin, Frederick Seykora, Justin DiTullio, Emmet Sargeant - cello
Dorothy Remsen - harp
Robert Helfer - orchestra manager
George DelBarrio, Dick Hazard - arranger
holi:3

References

Lalo Schifrin albums
1968 albums
Albums arranged by Lalo Schifrin
Dot Records albums
Mission: Impossible music
Mission: Impossible (1966 TV series)